The third annual Konami Cup Asia Series was held in November 2007 with four teams participating. The champions from the domestic leagues in Japan, South Korea, Taiwan along with an all-star team from China took part in the competition. The tournament was sponsored by the Nippon Professional Baseball Association and Konami Corporation. All games were held in Tokyo Dome, Tokyo, Japan.  The Chunichi Dragons defeated the SK Wyverns in the title game to win the championship for Japan. Infielder Hirokazu Ibata was named the MVP of the series.

Participating teams
  China Baseball League (China): China Stars, an all-star team of China Baseball League.
  Nippon Professional Baseball (Japan): Chunichi Dragons, winner of 2007 Japan Series.  Based in Nagoya, Japan.
  Korea Baseball Organization (Korea): SK Wyverns, winner of 2007 Korea Series. Based in Incheon, South Korea.
  Chinese Professional Baseball League (Taiwan): Uni-President Lions, winner of 2007 Taiwan Series. Based in Tainan, Taiwan.

Round Robin

Standings

Results
All times are Japan Standard Time (UTC+9)

Championship

See also 
 Japan Series
 Korea Series
 Taiwan Series
 World Series

External links 

 KONAMI CUP Asia Series

Asia Series
Asia
International baseball competitions hosted by Japan
Asia Series
Asia Series
Sports competitions in Tokyo
Asia Series